Ardashir II, was the Sasanian King of Kings of Iran from 379 to 383. He was the brother of his predecessor, Shapur II, under whom he had served as vassal king of Adiabene, where he fought alongside his brother against the Romans. Ardashir II was appointed as his brother's successor to rule interimly till the latter's son Shapur III reached adulthood. Ardashir II's short reign was largely uneventful, with the Sasanians unsuccessfully trying to maintain rule over Armenia.

Ardashir II was seemingly a strong-willed character, and is known in some sources by the epithet of nihoukar ("the beneficent").

Name
Ardashir is the Middle Persian form of the Old Persian Ṛtaxšira (also spelled Artaxšaçā, meaning "whose reign is through truth"). Three kings of the Achaemenid Empire were known to have the same name.

Background
Ardashir was the son of shah Hormizd II, who was killed by the Iranian nobility whilst hunting. He was succeeded by Adur Narseh, who, after a brief reign which only lasted a few months, was too killed by the nobles, who then proceeded to blind the second, and imprison the third (Hormizd, who later managed to escape to the Roman Empire). Ardashir's infant half-brother Shapur II, who was only slightly older than him, was crowned as king by the nobles so that they could gain greater control of the empire, which they were able to do until Shapur II reached his majority at the age of 16.

Ardashir, before becoming king of the Sasanian Empire, was vassal king of Adiabene from 344 to 376. It is believed that during his tenure he took part in the defense of the Sasanian Empire with Shapur when it was invaded by the Roman Emperor Julian. Ardashir is the last figure to be recorded as king of Adiabene, which implies that the kingdom was after his tenure transformed into a province (shahr), governed by a non-royal delegate (marzban or shahrab) of the Sasanian shah. In 379, Shapur II designated Ardashir as his successor, and made him vow to abdicate when Shapur's son, Shapur III reached adulthood. This led to some Armenian writers to wrongly state that Ardashir was Shapur's son.

Reign

Armenia had been constantly the source of war between the Roman and Sasanian Empires. In 378/9, Shapur II had achieved Iranian hegemony over the country after its regent Manuel Mamikonian submitted to him. A force 10,000 of Iranian soldiers led by general Surena were dispatched to Armenia. Surena was given the title of marzban (margrave), which indicates that Armenia was now a Sasanian province. But this did not work for long. During the early reign of Ardashir II, a nobleman named Meruzhan Artsruni deliberately gave Manuel wrong information, informing him that commandant of the Iranian garrison desired to capture him. Enraged, Manuel fell upon the ten thousand Iranian soldiers stationed in Armenia and murdered them.

Ardashir responded by sending an army under Gumand Shapuh to subdue Manuel, but the latter defeated the force and killed Gumand Shapuh. Another Iranian force, led by Varaz, was subsequently dispatched to Armenia, but met the same fate as his predecessor. A third army was sent into Armenia, led by general Mrkhan. Parts of Armenia was captured by the Iranians, but they were soon defeated and massacred by Manuel and his forces. This new victory guaranteed Armenia seven years of peace. Ardashir was soon deposed or killed by the nobility, due to his continuation of Shapur II's policy of restricting the authority of power-hungry nobles. He was succeeded by Shapur III.

Ardashir II was seemingly a strong-willed character, and is known in some sources by the epithet of nihoukar ("the beneficent").

Coins 

The coins minted under Ardashir imitates him wearing the same dome-shaped crown worn by the first Sasanian shah, Ardashir I. The reverse shows the traditional fire altar flanked by two attendants, but in some cases also shows the shah's head appearing from the fire, which may symbolize the royal xwarra ("glory"). The inscription of his coins are usually "Ardashir, king of kings of the Iranians" whilst rare instances of "and of non-Iranians" also being part of the inscription.

Rock relief 

Ardashir, like his forefathers, also had himself memorialized on reliefs. However, instead of using the sites of Pars (present-day Fars Province) as a place for his relief, he instead had a relief carved in Taq-e Bostan in the province of Media (near present-day Kermanshah). The relief shows three standing figures wearing regalia; Ardashir being in the middle, flanked by two male figures. The figure to the right, who is giving the diadem to Ardashir originally used to recognized as the Zoroastrian supreme god Ahura Mazda, but is now agreed to be Shapur II due to the style of his crown, and which also fits well due to Shapur being the one designating Ardashir as shah to begin with.

The two shahs are standing on the body of a fallen enemy, unmistakably a Roman, whose crown indicates that he is an emperor. The fallen figure is most likely supposed to represent the Roman emperor Julian, who invaded Iran in 363 and was killed west of the Sasanian capital of Ctesiphon. The figure standing to the far left, perceived by some to be the Zoroastrian prophet Zoroaster, is most likely the angelic divinity Mithra. He is wearing a crown embellished with twelve rays of the sun, whilst holding a raised barsom, thus sanctifying the investiture.

Notes

References

Bibliography

Ancient works 
Faustus of Byzantium, History of the Armenians.

Modern works

Further reading 
 

383 deaths
4th-century Sasanian monarchs
4th-century births
People of the Roman–Sasanian Wars
Shahnameh characters
Governors of the Sasanian Empire
Julian's Persian expedition
Generals of Shapur II
Kings of Adiabene